Persian Gulf Inferno (with a leading The on the title screen, but not the box cover) is a side-scrolling action-adventure game released for the Amiga in 1989, and the Atari ST and Commodore 64 in 1990.

The game was originally designed and developed by a Danish team of Amiga programmers called Parsec. Team members were Kevin Mikkelsen, Allan Pedersen and Jim Rankenberg.

References

External links
Persian Gulf Inferno at Amiga Hall of Light
Persian Gulf Inferno at Atari Mania

1989 video games
Action-adventure games
Amiga games
Atari ST games
Commodore 64 games
Video games developed in Denmark